Labateca is a Colombian municipality and town located in the department of North Santander.

References
  Government of Norte de Santander - Labateca
  Labateca official website

Municipalities of the Norte de Santander Department